Arthur Lee McGee (March 25, 1933 – July 1, 2019) was an American fashion designer. In 1957, he was the first African American designer hired to run a design studio on Seventh Avenue in the Garment District in New York City.

Early life and education 
Arthur Lee McGee was born on March 25, 1933 in Detroit, Michigan. His mother Rose was a dressmaker, she created her own clothing designs and taught he to him about fashion early in his childhood. His mother liked hats, so as a child he was determined to learn to make hats so he could make her one.

He attended Traphagen School of Fashion in New York City because he had won a scholarship. He graduated from Traphagen in 1951 in Costume Design. He continued his studies in millinery and apparel design at Fashion Institute of Technology (FIT) to refine his skills. At the same time he was in school, he studied with fashion designer, Charles James. He dropped out of FIT in 1956 before graduating after he was told there were no jobs for black designers and the Dean suggested he start looking for jobs as a presser.

Career 
He spoke openly about being treated poorly in design offices in the early years and being assumed to not be the fashion designer, even when he was dressed in designer clothing, because he was black. In his early jobs he was allowed to create the fashion designs and build the clothing for the firm, but he was not allowed to use his own name. He opened up a small space in Greenwich Village and sold clothing to a few celebrities one weekend, and from then he had work from Broadway shows needing costumes.

By 1957, at the age of 24, he was running the design room for Bobby Brooks, Inc, a women's apparel company. He was the first African American to hold this job position at an established Seventh Avenue apparel company.

McGee's clothing designs were known for bring both African and Asian fashion aesthetics together, often featuring a looser silhouette and fabrics from Africa. In 1960s he opened his own design store on St. Mark’s Place in New York City. In addition the 1960s and 1970s he worked for College Town of Boston, a collegiate themed women's apparel company. He was most active in design between the 1960s until the 1980s. His designs were sold at larger department stores, and in many cases these were the first time the stores carried any African American fashion designers work, including Saks Fifth Avenue, Bloomingdale’s, Henri Bendel, and Bergdorf Goodman.

Some of his clients included Lena Horne, Sybil Burton, Cicely Tyson, and Stevie Wonder. He designed musician Dexter Gordon's custom suit he wore to the 1987 Academy Awards when he was nominated for an Oscar for the film Round Midnight.

Death and legacy 
McGee died July 1, 2019 at the age of 86, in a nursing home in New York City after a long battle with illness.

McGee had been a mentor to fashion designer, Willi Smith. And McGee influenced many younger designers of the 1970s including, Stephen Burrows, Scott Barrie, B. Michael, Jeffrey Banks, and James Daugherty. His work is included in various public museum collections including the Metropolitan Museum of Art, National Museum of African American History and Culture, among others.

McGee's work was featured on the television show Antiques Roadshow (Season 24 Episode 30).

References

External links 
 Video: The Fashion of Arthur McGee (2009) from the Metropolitan Museum of Art

1933 births
2019 deaths
American fashion designers
African-American fashion designers
People from Detroit
Traphagen School of Fashion alumni
Fashion Institute of Technology alumni
People from New York City
1980s fashion
20th-century African-American people
21st-century African-American people